816 Naval Air Squadron was a Royal Navy Fleet Air Arm carrier based squadron formed at the start of the Second World War.

The squadron formed aboard  in October 1939 with 9 Fairey Swordfish torpedo bombers for anti-submarine duty on convoys between the UK and Canada

In 1948 it was re-formed as 816 Squadron RAN an Australian squadron with the Fairey Firefly and embarked on HMAS Sydney.

Battle honours
Norway 1940,
Narvik 1940,
Malta Convoys 1941,
Mediterranean 1941,
Atlantic 1943,
Arctic 1944,
Normandy 1944

Aircraft operated
Fairey Swordfish I (Anti submarine Warfare, Search)
Fairey Swordfish II (Strike)
Supermarine Seafire Ib & L.IIc (Strike)
Grumman Wildcat V (Strike)
Fairey Barracuda II (Torpedo/dive Bomber)
Fairey Firefly FR.I (Fighter Reconnaissance)
Fairey Firefly NF.I (Night Fighter)

See also
List of Fleet Air Arm aircraft squadrons

External links

Fleet Air Arm Archive
Australian Government history of 816 Squadron

816
Military units and formations established in 1939